Jiří Vondráček may refer to:

 Jiří Vondráček (football player) (born 1993), Czech football player
 Jiří Vondráček (triple jumper) (born 1988), Czech triple jumper and performer at the 2014 European Team Championships Super League
 Jiří Vondráček (musician), Czech composer and musician, father of Lucie Vondráčková and brother of Helena Vondráčková